The Dodge Viper (ZB I) is the third generation of the Viper sports car, manufactured by Dodge. The third generation received a heavy design change, designed by Osamu Shikado in 1999.

Development 

For the third generation, the Dodge Viper was heavily redesigned, courtesy of Osamu Shikado from Dodge's performance division, Street & Racing Technology. The design took inspiration from the Viper competition coupé concept, also designed by Shikado which was unveiled two years prior as a preview for the next generation of the Viper.

Production 

The new Viper was introduced in 2002, named as the SRT-10, which replaced both the RT/10 and GTS models. The chassis would become more rigid and lightweight, losing . A 6-speed Tremec T56 manual transmission is used to deliver all of the power to the rear wheels.

Three years later after the SRT-10 was unveiled, the coupé version of the Viper would be launched, adapting the same "double-bubble" structure as the GTS from the previous generation. The design of the car takes styling cues from the GTS, with the rear portion of the car adapting the tail shape, and the taillights using a design inspired by the GTS.

Dodge would stop production of the Viper for 2007, in lieu of preparing the new updates for the car for the 2008 model year.

Performance 

References 

Viper ZB I
Cars introduced in 2002